is a Japanese anime director, screenwriter, and producer. He has worked for Sunrise on many anime shows in the real robot genre, including Armored Trooper VOTOMS, Fang of the Sun Dougram, Panzer World Galient, and  Blue Comet SPT Layzner.

Works

References

External links
 

Sunrise (company) people
Anime directors
Japanese film directors
Japanese screenwriters
1943 births
Living people
People from Tokyo